The Great Blizzard of 1899, also known as the Great Arctic Outbreak of 1899 and the St. Valentine's Day Blizzard, was an exceptionally severe winter weather event that affected most of the United States, particularly east of the Rocky Mountains.

Temperatures and records

For the 1895–2017 period of record:
 February 1899 was the second-coldest February in the contiguous U.S. (behind only 1936).
 December 1898 through February 1899 was the third-coldest meteorological winter in the contiguous U.S. (behind the coldest and second-coldest winters of 1978/79 and 1935/36, respectively).
 February 1899 was the coldest February in Kansas, Missouri, and Wyoming.
 February 1899 was the second-coldest February in Arkansas, Colorado, Mississippi, Montana, Nebraska, Oklahoma, and South Dakota.

Winter weather
On February 12, snow flurries were reported in areas from New Orleans eastward to Tampa. The storm crossed the Florida peninsula and intensified as it moved rapidly up the east coast. High Point, North Carolina, recorded  of snow. (On January 28, 1772,  of snow fell in the Washington area during the "Washington and Jefferson Snowstorm"; however that was before official record-keeping began.)

On February 19, ice floes were reported to be moving out of the Mississippi River into the Gulf of Mexico. The Rex parade was delayed while snow was removed from the route.

The city has only recorded a lower temperature twice since record-keeping commenced on September 6, 1895.

Casualties, damages and inconveniences
The Great Arctic Outbreak of 1899 had disastrous impact across many areas of the continental U.S. and Cuba as people, livestock, and wildlife succumbed to the frigid cold.

U.S. bird populations were decimated across the nation. Henderson County, Tennessee saw nearly the complete extinction of its bluebird population and Culpeper County, as well as most northern and central Virginia counties lost nearly all of its quail, having to import new birds in the late teens and 1920s to repopulate the areas.

Some of the bird species affected: Bluebird, Blue-headed vireo, Catbirds, Chipping sparrow, Dark-eyed junco (also known as snowbird), Fox sparrow, Grass finch, Hermit thrush, Killdeer, Meadowlark, Mourning dove, Pine warbler, Quail, Savannah sparrow, Song sparrow, Swamp sparrow, and Woodcock.

It has been estimated that over 100 people died. In Brooklyn, 31 year-old Mary Goodwin was frozen to death and a thinly clad, unidentified woman in The Dalles, Oregon, was found frozen to death in a hallway in an attempt to find warmth. Mail carriers Palmer and Hawkins of New York were thought to have drowned attempting to deliver the mail. It is believed that their boat, overturned by the high winds, was crushed by the floating ice.

Crops were ruined, and orchards were utterly destroyed in Georgia. Walla Walla, Washington's majority of wheat was destroyed by the frost with Eureka Flat seeing

the most damage.

Traffic was brought to a complete standstill in all parts of the country. Barges on the Mississippi river, which was in some parts entirely frozen through and the Great Lakes, were brought to a complete standstill . Traffic across all railroads were delayed or paralyzed indefinitely while steamers and liners were likewise delayed.

See also
Great Freeze

References

1899-2
1899 meteorology
1899 natural disasters in the United States
1899 in the environment
February 1899 events